The 2019 Humpty's Champions Cup was held from April 23 to 28 at the Merlis Belsher Place in Saskatoon, Saskatchewan. It was the eighth and final Grand Slam event of the 2018–19 curling season. In the men's final, Brendan Bottcher defeated Kevin Koe 6–5 to win his 3rd career Grand Slam. In the women's final, Silvana Tirinzoni defeated Kerri Einarson 6–3 to win her 2nd career Slam.

No tick zone
The 2019 Champions Cup tested a new rule, where tick shots were disallowed in the 8th and extra ends. Any rock that touches the centre line in those ends was not allowed to be moved by an opposing rock until after the fifth rock of the end had been played. This rule had previously been used in the defunct Elite 10 Grand Slam event.

Qualification
The champions of thirteen Grand Slam, national or regional championships, and world championship events are invited to the Champions Cup. The champions of two World Curling Tour events, based on the strength of field, are also invited. If a team qualifies from more than one event or declines the invitation, champions of World Curling Tour events with the highest strength of field are invited until the field of 15 teams is completed.

Men

Women

Men

Teams
The teams are listed as follows:

Round-robin standings
Final round-robin standings

Round-robin results
All draw times are listed in Central Standard Time (UTC−6).

Draw 1
Tuesday, April 23, 4:30 pm

Draw 2
Tuesday, April 23, 8:00 pm

Draw 3
Wednesday, April 24, 12:00 pm

Draw 4
Wednesday, April 24, 4:00 pm

Draw 5
Wednesday, April 24, 8:00 pm

Draw 6
Thursday, April 25, 8:30 am

Draw 7
Thursday, April 25, 12:00 pm

Draw 8
Thursday, April 25, 4:00 pm

Draw 9
Thursday, April 25, 8:00 pm

Draw 10
Friday, April 26, 8:30 am

Draw 11
Friday, April 26, 12:00 pm

Draw 12
Friday, April 26, 4:00 pm

Draw 13
Friday, April 26, 8:00 pm

Tiebreaker
Saturday, April 27, 8:30 am

Playoffs

Quarterfinals
Saturday, April 27, 4:00 pm

Semifinals
Saturday, April 27, 8:00 pm

Final
Sunday, April 28, 10:00 am

Women

Teams
The teams are listed as follows:

Round-robin standings
Final round-robin standings

Round-robin results
All draw times are listed in Central Standard Time (UTC−6).

Draw 1
Tuesday, April 23, 4:30 pm

Draw 2
Tuesday, April 23, 8:00 pm

Draw 3
Wednesday, April 24, 12:00 pm

Draw 4
Wednesday, April 24, 4:00 pm

Draw 5
Wednesday, April 24, 8:00 pm

Draw 6
Thursday, April 25, 8:30 am

Draw 7
Thursday, April 25, 12:00 pm

Draw 8
Thursday, April 25, 4:00 pm

Draw 9
Thursday, April 25, 8:00 pm

Draw 10
Thursday, April 26, 8:30 am

Draw 11
Thursday, April 26, 12:00 am

Draw 12
Thursday, April 26, 4:00 pm

Tiebreakers
Thursday, April 26, 8:00 pm

Friday, April 27, 8:30 am

Playoffs

Quarterfinals
Saturday, April 27, 12:00 pm

Semifinals
Saturday, April 27, 8:00 pm

Final
Sunday, April 28, 2:00 pm

Notes

References

External links
 

Champions Cup (curling)
Champions Cup
Champions Cup
Champions Cup
Curling in Saskatoon
Sports competitions in Saskatoon